Protein phosphatase 1 regulatory subunit 14B is an enzyme that in humans is encoded by the PPP1R14B gene.

References

Further reading